Zethes insularis is a species of moth in the family Erebidae first described by Jules Pierre Rambur in 1833. The species is found in the warmer parts of the Mediterranean area: Armenia and the Caucasus, Iraq, south-western Iran, Lebanon, Israel, Syria and Jordan.

Adults are on wing from March to October. There are several generations per year.

External links

Lepiforum e.V. 

Ophiusini
Moths of Europe
Insects of Turkey
Moths of the Middle East
Taxa named by Jules Pierre Rambur
Moths described in 1833